The High Sign is a 1917 American silent drama film directed by Elmer Clifton and starring Herbert Rawlinson, Agnes Vernon and Hayward Mack.

Cast
 Herbert Rawlinson as Donald Bruce
 Agnes Vernon as Hulda Maroff 
 Hayward Mack as Prince Arnoff
 Nellie Allen as Vonia Grayley
 Ed Brady as Hugo Mackensen
 Mark Fenton as Ivan Posloff 
 Frank MacQuarrie as Metwer 
 Albert MacQuarrie as Nickelob

References

Bibliography
James Robert Parish & Michael R. Pitts. Film directors: a guide to their American films. Scarecrow Press, 1974.

External links
 

1917 films
1917 drama films
1910s English-language films
American silent feature films
Silent American drama films
American black-and-white films
Universal Pictures films
Films directed by Elmer Clifton
1910s American films